Paschiodes is a genus of moths of the family Crambidae.

Species
Paschiodes aethiopicalis (Hampson, 1913)
Paschiodes mesoleucalis Hampson, 1913
Paschiodes okuensis Maes, 2000
Paschiodes scoparialis (Viette, 1957)
Paschiodes thomealis Viette, 1957
Paschiodes ugandae Maes, 2005

References

Natural History Museum Lepidoptera genus database

Pyraustinae
Crambidae genera
Taxa named by George Hampson